Nagore is a town in Tamil Nadu, India.

Nagore may also refer to:

 Nagore (footballer) (born 1980), Spanish football player
 Nagore Calderón (born 1993), Spanish football player
 Nagore E. M. Hanifa (1925–2015), Indian lyricist, playback singer and politician
 Nagore Gabellanes (born 1973), Spanish field hockey player
 Txomin Nagore (born 1974), Slyricist, playback singer and politicianpanish footballer

See also 
 Nagaur, a city in Rajasthan, India
 Nagoor (disambiguation)